Milford is a city in Geary County, Kansas, United States.  As of the 2020 census, the population of the city was 408.

History
Milford was originally called Bachelder, and under the latter name was laid out in 1855. Milford contained a lumber mill in its early days.

Geography
Milford is located at  (39.173454, -96.911650).

Climate
The climate in this area is characterized by hot, humid summers and generally mild to cool winters.  According to the Köppen Climate Classification system, Milford has a humid subtropical climate, abbreviated "Cfa" on climate maps.

Demographics

Milford is part of the Manhattan, Kansas Metropolitan Statistical Area.

2010 census
As of the census of 2010, there were 530 people, 203 households, and 133 families residing in the city. The racial makeup of the city was 83.4% White, 5.7% African American, 0.4% Native American, 0.9% Asian, 0.2% Pacific Islander, 1.3% from other races, and 8.1% from two or more races. Hispanic or Latino of any race were 5.7% of the population.

There were 203 households, of which 36.0% had children under the age of 18 living with them, 54.7% were married couples living together, 8.9% had a female householder with no husband present, 2.0% had a male householder with no wife present, and 34.5% were non-families. 25.1% of all households were made up of individuals, and 4% had someone living alone who was 65 years of age or older. The average household size was 2.61 and the average family size was 3.18.

The median age in the city was 32.8 years. 25.8% of residents were under the age of 18; 11.9% were between the ages of 18 and 24; 30.4% were from 25 to 44; 22.7% were from 45 to 64; and 9.2% were 65 years of age or older. The gender makeup of the city was 54.2% male and 45.8% female.

2000 census
As of the census of 2000, there were 502 people, 183 households, and 133 families residing in the city. The racial makeup of the city was 84.66% White, 3.19% African American, 0.40% Native American, 0.80% Asian, 1.00% Pacific Islander, 3.59% from other races, and 6.37% from two or more races. Hispanic or Latino of any race were 6.37% of the population.

There were 183 households, out of which 41.5% had children under the age of 18 living with them, 63.4% were married couples living together, 6.6% had a female householder with no husband present, and 26.8% were non-families. 22.4% of all households were made up of individuals, and 6.0% had someone living alone who was 65 years of age or older. The average household size was 2.74 and the average family size was 3.27.

In the city, the population was spread out, with 34.1% under the age of 18, 11.6% from 18 to 24, 32.7% from 25 to 44, 15.9% from 45 to 64, and 5.8% who were 65 years of age or older. The median age was 28 years. For every 100 females, there were 110.0 males. For every 100 females age 18 and over, there were 110.8 males.

The median income for a household in the city was $33,750, and the median income for a family was $40,000. Males had a median income of $29,583 versus $16,250 for females. The per capita income for the city was $14,246. About 10.3% of families and 8.1% of the population were below the poverty line, including 7.7% of those under age 18 and 8.8% of those age 65 or over.

Education
The community is served by Geary County USD 475 public school district.

Milford High School was closed through school unification. The Milford High School mascot was the Panthers.

Parks and recreation
 Milford Lake and Milford State Park

Notable people
 John R. Brinkley, controversial medical doctor, advertising and radio pioneer
 Henry D. Linscott, veteran of both World Wars, later lieutenant general in the Marine Corps

References

Further reading

External links
 Milford - Directory of Public Officials
 Milford city map, KDOT

Cities in Kansas
Cities in Geary County, Kansas
Manhattan, Kansas metropolitan area